Aline Sitoe Diatta (also Aline Sitow Diatta or Alyn Sytoe Jata; 1920 – 22 May 1944) was a Senegalese heroine of the opposition to the French colonial empire, and a strong young female symbol of resistance and liberty. A Jola leader of a local religious group living in the village of Kabrousse, Basse Casamance, Diatta was one of the leaders of a tax resistance movement during World War II.

Biography
Diatta was born in Kabrousse. She was orphaned and adopted by her uncle, Elubaliin Diatta. He died a few years after her adoption in a Ziguinchor jail. Diatta left the village of Kabrousse to work in Ziguinchor, later moving on to Dakar and making her residence in Médina.

While Jola resistance had never really ended since the region was annexed to French West Africa in 1914, in 1942 the French government began seizing as much as half the area's rice harvest for their war effort. When a boycott begun by market women proved successful, the French authorities imprisoned the boycott's leadership. Diatta, an esteemed woman leader with a strong following was believed to have religious powers and was marked out by authorities as a leader. She remained in prison, and was deported to a jail in Timbuktu, Mali in 1943. There she died of disease on 22 May 1944.

Legacy
Since her death, Diatta has become one of the best known symbols of resistance in West Africa, and a national symbol in Senegal, especially in Casamance.  The Girls University Students Hostel Campus  in Dakar, near Cheikh Anta Diop University is named Cité Aline Sitoe Diatta, the main Stadium in Ziguinchor bears her name as well, and numerous schools, businesses, and organizations are named after her. The passenger ferry MV Aline Sitoe Diatta is named for her.

In 2008, an unofficial fantasy coin of the "Kingdom" of Kabrousse was issued honoring "Reine Aline Sitoé Diatta" (Queen Aline Sitoé Diatta). The coin refers to her as "La femme qui était plus qu'un homme" ("the woman who was more than a man").

References

Sources
 Wilmetta Jesvalynn Toliver, Aline Sitoe Diatta: addressing historical silences through Senegalese culture, Ann Arbor, UMI Dissertation Services, 2002
 W. J. Toliver-Diallo, « The Woman Who Was More Than a Man: Making Aline Sitoe Diatta into a National Heroine in Senegal », Canadian Journal of African Studies, 2005, vol. 39
 
Journées culturelles Aline Sitoé Diatta : Les étudiantes réclament les cendres de leur marraine  in  Le Quotidien 23 février 2004
kassoumay.com: Histoire de la Casamance
  Quand Ndaté Yalla et Aline Sitoe Diatta inspirent les Sénégalaises  APS, 7 Feb. 2007.

Further reading
 Karine Silla, Aline et les hommes de guerre, Paris, L'Observatoire, 2020, 

1920 births
1944 deaths
People from Ziguinchor Region
People of colonial Senegal
Senegalese women
Tax resisters
Female religious leaders
African resistance to colonialism
Senegalese prisoners and detainees
Prisoners who died in French detention